Pseudohalogens are polyatomic analogues of halogens, whose chemistry, resembling that of the true halogens, allows them to substitute for halogens in several classes of chemical compounds. Pseudohalogens occur in pseudohalogen molecules, inorganic molecules of the general forms Ps–Ps or Ps–X (where Ps is a pseudohalogen group), such as cyanogen; pseudohalide anions, such as cyanide ion; inorganic acids, such as hydrogen cyanide; as ligands in coordination complexes, such as ferricyanide; and as functional groups in organic molecules, such as the nitrile group. Well-known pseudohalogen functional groups include cyanide, cyanate, thiocyanate, and azide.

Common pseudohalogens and their nomenclature 
Many pseudohalogens are known by specialized common names according to where they occur in a compound. Well-known ones include (the true halogen chlorine is listed for comparison):

 is considered to be a pseudohalogen ion due to its disproportionation reaction with alkali and the ability to form covalent bonds with hydrogen.

Examples of pseudohalogen molecules
Examples of symmetrical pseudohalogen compounds (where Ps is a pseudohalogen) include cyanogen , thiocyanogen  and hydrogen peroxide . Another complex symmetrical pseudohalogen compound is dicobalt octacarbonyl, . This substance can be considered as a dimer of the hypothetical cobalt tetracarbonyl, .

Examples of non-symmetrical pseudohalogen compounds (pseudohalogen halides , where Ps is a pseudohalogen and X is a halogen, or interpseudohalogens , where  are two different pseudohalogens), analogous to the binary interhalogen compounds, are cyanogen halides like cyanogen chloride, cyanogen bromide, nitryl fluoride, nitrosyl chloride and chlorine azide, as well as interpseudohalogens like dinitrogen trioxide, nitric acid and cyanogen azide.

Not all combinations of interpseudohalogens and pseudohalogen halides are known to be stable (e.g. sulfanol ).

Pseudohalides
Pseudohalides form univalent anions which form binary acids with hydrogen and form insoluble salts with silver such as silver cyanide (AgCN), silver cyanate (AgOCN), silver fulminate (AgCNO), silver thiocyanate (AgSCN) and silver azide.

A common complex pseudohalide is a tetracarbonylcobaltate . The acid cobalt tetracarbonyl hydride  is in fact quite a strong acid, though its low solubility renders it not as strong as the true hydrogen halide.

The behavior and chemical properties of the above pseudohalides are identical to that of the true halide ions. The presence of the internal multiple bonds does not appear to affect their chemical behavior. For example, they can form strong acids of the type HX (compare hydrogen chloride HCl to hydrogen tetracarbonylcobaltate ), and they can react with metals M to form compounds like MX (compare sodium chloride NaCl to sodium azide ).

Nanoclusters of aluminium (often referred to as superatoms) are sometimes considered to be pseudohalides since they, too, behave chemically as halide ions, forming [[Superatom#Aluminum clusters| (analogous to triiodide ) and similar compounds. This is due to the effects of metallic bonding on small scales.

References